Angelo Furlan (born 21 June 1977 in Arzignano) is an Italian former professional road bicycle racer.

Major results

2001
 1st Stage 2 Tour de Pologne
 Tour of Serbia
1st Stage 1 & 2
2002
 Vuelta a España
1st Stages 17 & 20
2004
 1st Coppa Bernocchi
2007
 1st Stage 1 Étoile de Bessèges
 1st Stage 1 Circuit de la Sarthe
2008
 1st Stage 4 Étoile de Bessèges
 1st Stage 2 Volta ao Distrito de Santarém
 1st Stage 3 Tour de Pologne
2009
 1st Stage 2 Critérium du Dauphiné Libéré
2011
 1st Tallinn-Tartu GP
 1st Stage 1 Tour de Serbie
2013
 1st Stage 2 Tour of Estonia
 5th Overall Tour of China II
 10th Jūrmala GP

References

External links 

Italian male cyclists
1977 births
Living people
People from Arzignano
Italian Vuelta a España stage winners
Cyclists from the Province of Vicenza